The 47th International Swedish Rally was held between 6-8 February 1998.

Report

WRC: Round 2
It was the first World Rally Championship victory of the season for defending champion Tommi Mäkinen. He beat the Toyota Corolla of Carlos Sainz and the Ford Escort WRC of Juha Kankkunen, ensuring that current and former World Rally Champions swept the podium. The home driver Thomas Rådström led for most of the event, but crashed on stage 12, allowing Mäkinen to snatch victory. The Scotsman Colin McRae also went out on stage 12, when electrical gremlins struck his Subaru Impreza WRC.

PWRC: Round 2
The PWRC was also won by Stig-Olov Walfridson. He and fellow Swede Kenneth Bäcklund were the main contenders for overall victory; whilst the Uruguayan defending champion Gustavo Trelles came to grief once again, after being struck by a terminal engine failure on Special Stage 2 which meant he had retired from the second rally in a row. Finishing in third place was Juha Kangas.

Results

References

Swedish Rally
1998 World Rally Championship season
1998 in Swedish motorsport